Persematim (stands for Persatuan Sepakbola Manggarai Timur) is a Indonesian football team based at Lengko Ajang Field, East Manggarai Regency, East Nusa Tenggara. This team competes in Liga 3 East Nusa Tenggara Zone.

References

External links

East Manggarai Regency
Football clubs in East Nusa Tenggara
Association football clubs established in 2007
2007 establishments in Indonesia